The 2013 Indiana Hoosiers football team represented the Indiana University during the 2013 NCAA Division I FBS football season. The Hoosiers played in the Leaders Division of the Big Ten Conference and played their home games at Memorial Stadium in Bloomington, Indiana. The team was led by head coach Kevin Wilson, who was in his third season. They finished the season 5–7, 3–5 in Big Ten play to finish in fourth place in the Leaders Division.

Preseason

Recruits

Coaching staff

Schedule

Roster

2014 NFL draftees

References

Indiana
Indiana Hoosiers football seasons
Indiana Hoosiers football